Gong Ruina (born in 23 January 1981) is a badminton player from the People's Republic of China.

Career
Gong Ruina was one of the world's leading women's singles players, former World No. 1 in the first few years of the 21st century. She won a number of top tier international titles including the 2001 IBF World Championships in Seville, Spain and the venerable All-England Championships (2004). In both of these events she defeated fellow countrywoman Zhou Mi, one of her principal rivals, in the finals. On the other hand, Gong was beaten by Zhou in the final of the Asian Games (2002), and was denied a bronze medal by her at the 2004 Athens Olympics after each had been beaten in the semifinals.

Gong played singles for China's world champion Uber Cup (women's international) teams of 2002 and 2004. Her other individual titles included the Brunei (1998), Swedish (1999), Malaysia (2001), China (2002), Indonesia (2002), Denmark (2003), and Swiss (2004) Opens. She was a bronze medalist at the 1999 IBF World Championships in Copenhagen, and a silver medalist behind fellow countrywoman Zhang Ning at the 2003 IBF World Championships in Birmingham, England.

Gong retired in the prime of her career to explore other opportunities in her life in June 2005. She once lived in Hong Kong with her husband, a Chinese entrepreneur who has a company in Hong Kong, and with her two children. She now works as the head coach of the Hunan province amateur badminton team.

Achievements

World Championships 
Women's singles

Asian Games 
Women's singles

Asian Championships 
Women's singles

World Junior Championships 
Girls' singles

Girls' doubles

Asian Junior Championships 
Girls' singles

Girls' doubles

Mixed doubles

IBF World Grand Prix
The World Badminton Grand Prix sanctioned by International Badminton Federation (IBF) since 1983.

Women's singles

Record against selected opponents 
Record against year-end Finals finalists, World Championships semi-finalists, and Olympic quarter-finalists.

Footnotes 
Some sources give 龚睿娜.
The pronunciation of this name might also be Gōng Ruìnǎ.  Please verify.

References

External links
 
 
 龚睿那 Gong Rui Na at www.badmintoncn.com

1981 births
Living people
People from Yiyang
Badminton players from Hunan
Chinese female badminton players
Olympic badminton players of China
Badminton players at the 2004 Summer Olympics
Badminton players at the 2002 Asian Games
Asian Games gold medalists for China
Asian Games silver medalists for China
Asian Games medalists in badminton
Medalists at the 2002 Asian Games
World No. 1 badminton players
21st-century Chinese women
20th-century Chinese women